Paraxenylla is a genus of springtails in the family Hypogastruridae. There are about 10 described species in Paraxenylla.

Species
These 10 species belong to the genus Paraxenylla:
 Paraxenylla affiniformis (Stach, 1930) i c g
 Paraxenylla arenosa (Uchida & Tamura, 1967) i c g
 Paraxenylla cubana Palacios-Vargas & Janssens, 2006 i c g
 Paraxenylla lapazana Palacios-Vargas & Vàzquez, 1989 i c g
 Paraxenylla mangle (Murphy, 1965) i c g
 Paraxenylla norvegica Fjellberg, 2010 g
 Paraxenylla oceanica (Yosii, 1960) i c g
 Paraxenylla peruensis Palacios-Vargas & Janssens, 2006 i c g
 Paraxenylla piloua Thibaud & Weiner in Najt, & Matile, 1997 i c g
 Paraxenylla sooretamensis g
Data sources: i = ITIS, c = Catalogue of Life, g = GBIF, b = Bugguide.net

References

Further reading

 
 
 

Collembola
Springtail genera